Melanie Barbara Chartoff (born December 15, 1948) is an American actress and comedian. She first became famous for her comedy work on the ABC series Fridays (1980–82), and in the 1990s Fox sitcom Parker Lewis Can't Lose. She voiced both Didi Pickles and Grandma Minka, Didi's mother on the Nickelodeon animated series Rugrats and All Grown Up!.

Early life
Chartoff was born on December 15, 1948, in New Haven, Connecticut, and attended West Haven High School. She went on to earn a Bachelor of Arts from Adelphi University. She is Jewish.

Career
Her first Broadway appearances were in Galt MacDermot's space opera Via Galactica (1972), directed by Peter Hall, and The Young Vic's Scapino, starring Jim Dale (1974).

Chartoff's first TV role came in 1976 when she played a nurse on Search For Tomorrow, after which appeared in the 1978 motion picture American Hot Wax. She first became a nationally known figure on ABC's Fridays, which was ABC's attempt to create its own version of Saturday Night Live. She immediately stood out on the series, partly thanks to her regular role as the anchor on the show's fake newscasts, but also due to her comedic skills (particularly an impression of Nancy Reagan). On one sketch, she was cold-cocked on live TV when co-star Maryedith Burrell failed to pull her punch during a skit and chipped Chartoff's tooth.

Between the demise of Fridays in 1982 and her return to a regular series in 1990 with Parker Lewis Can't Lose (in which she co-starred for three seasons as the high-strung Principal Grace Musso), Chartoff continued to work steadily on television throughout the 1980s, including appearances on Mr. Belvedere, Wiseguy, and St. Elsewhere, as well as a recurring role on Newhart as Dr. Kaiser. She made two appearances on Seinfeld, including one in the 1998 series finale in which four of her former Fridays co-stars were also involved (including Michael Richards). She appeared in the 2006 season finale of Desperate Housewives.

In the Los Angeles premiere of Bill Finn and James Lapine's musical March of the Falsettos (1982), for which she won a Drama-Logue Award, she played Trina. She played Mary Jane Wilkes in the La Jolla Playhouse premiere of Big River (1984). At South Coast Repertory she appeared in the world Premiere of On the Jump. She played Dot in the West Coast premiere of Sunday in the Park with George at San Francisco's American Conservatory Theater (1986).

Inventing
In 1991, Chartoff and fellow voice actor Michael Bell conceived the Grayway Rotating Drain, a greywater recycling device for reuse of shower and sink water in the home. The following year, they finished and patented the product with the help of Ronald K. Ford.

Voice acting and current projects
Chartoff's first voice-over work was a guest role on Challenge of the Super Friends. She has continued her work as an in-demand voice actress and also takes occasional TV and stage roles. She works as a coach to both actors and non-actors to make them more charismatic in public performances. In 2005, she interviewed Laraine Newman for Autograph Collector magazine. She writes for The Huffington Post, The Jewish Journal, Defenestration Magazine, and The Funny Times. She performs her original material at such Los Angeles venues as Comedy Central's "Sit n' Spin," "Tasty Words," and "I Love a Good Story."

Rugrats
From 1991 to 2008, Chartoff voiced Didi Pickles and her mother Grandma Minka on the Nickelodeon series Rugrats, for which she won a Daytime Emmy. She continued to voice Didi on the Rugrats spin-off series, All Grown Up!. For the 2021 revival series of the same name, Chartoff was replaced by actress Ashley Spillers.

Awards
Aside from Drama-Logue and Daytime Emmy Awards, she was cited by the City of Hope for creating and producing the yearly event Halloween for Hope to benefit children's cancer research and received a Certificate of Appreciation from the Mayor of Los Angeles for her concerts for the homeless. She is listed in Who's Who in California, and Who's Who in American Colleges and Universities.

Filmography

Film

Television

Video games

References

External links
 
 Patent 5274861 information
 "Actress Stars as Inventor", Los Angeles Times. Retrieved July 2, 2015.
Profile, TheaterMania.com. Retrieved July 2, 2015.

1948 births
Living people
Actresses from New Haven, Connecticut
Adelphi University alumni
American sketch comedians
American stage actresses
American television actresses
American voice actresses
American women comedians
Daytime Emmy Award winners
Jewish American actresses
Women inventors
20th-century American actresses
21st-century American actresses
20th-century American comedians
21st-century American comedians
20th-century American inventors
21st-century American Jews